Year 1186 (MCLXXXVI) was a common year starting on Wednesday (link will display the full calendar) of the Julian calendar.

Events 
 January 27 – Constance of Sicily marries Henry (the future Henry VI, Holy Roman Emperor).
 John the Chanter becomes Bishop of Exeter.
 The Byzantine Empire recognizes the independence of Bulgaria and Serbia.
 Joscius becomes Archbishop of Tyre.
 Jayavarman VII, the king of Cambodia, founds the temple of Ta Prohm.
 After the death of the child-king Baldwin V, his mother succeeds him as Sibylla of Jerusalem, and appoints her disfavoured husband Guy de Lusignan king consort. This comes as a shock to Jerusalem's court, who had earlier forced the possible future Queen into promising that should she become so, she would not appoint him the title.
 The first nunnery is inaugurated in Iceland, the Kirkjubæjar Abbey.
 Caliph al-Nasir marries Princess Seljuki. Right after her betrothal to him, he brings her to live with him. He then sends an escort to bring her to Baghdad from Rum, consummates the marriage, and gives her priceless jewels and lavish gifts.

Births 
 May 18 – Konstantin of Rostov, Prince of Novgorod (d. 1218)
 date unknown
 Queen Urraca of Portugal, wife of King Afonso II of Portugal (d. 1220)
 Song Ci, Chinese physician and judge (d. 1249)
 William III of Sicily (d. 1198)
 Ogedei, third son and successor of Genghis Khan (d. 1241)

Deaths 
 January 26 – Ismat ad-Din Khatun, wife of Saladin
 May 29 or June 23 or June 24 – Robert of Torigni
 June 1 – Minamoto no Yukiie, Japanese warlord
 August 19 – Geoffrey II, Duke of Brittany (b. 1158)
 August – Baldwin V of Jerusalem (b. 1177)
 September 29 – William of Tyre, Archbishop of Tyre (b. c. 1130)
 December 8 – Berthold IV, Duke of Zähringen (b.c 1125)

References